Thomas Barbusca  is an American actor. He is known for portraying Chip Pemberton, one of the three kids on the television sitcom The Mick. He also starred in the film  Middle School: The Worst Years of My Life and plays Drew, the camp bully kid in the Netflix television series Wet Hot American Summer: First Day of Camp. He also had a role in the fifth season of American Horror Story.

Personal life
He has an older sister named Brielle who is also an actress. He currently lives in California. He is of Italian descent.

Career
In 2016, Barbusca was cast to co-star as Chip Pemberton on The Mick. He also starred in the film Middle School: The Worst Years of My Life as Leo based on the 2011 novel of the same name by James Patterson and Chris Tebbetts.

Filmography

Film

Television

References

External links

Living people
American male child actors
People from Ocean County, New Jersey
American male actors
People from New Jersey
Year of birth missing (living people)